The 59th Munich Security Conference (MSC 2023) took place from 17 to 19 February 2023 at the Hotel Bayerischer Hof in Munich.

This was dominated by the ongoing Russo-Ukrainian War.  Vladimir Putin and his 2022 Russian invasion of Ukraine were discussed by most of the speakers but he was not invited and did not attend.  The New York Times reported that the world was tense and fractured as the West also faced confrontation with China and an indifferent global South.

Director of the Office of the Central Foreign Affairs Commission of People's Republic of China Wang Yi announced his peace initiative for the 2022 Russian invasion of Ukraine. On the same day US Vice President Kamala Harris urged China not to arm Russia, while she announced that the US "has determined Russia has committed crimes against humanity in Ukraine." US Secretary of State Antony Blinken was adamant that "Any peace has to be consistent with the principles of the United Nations Charter."

Newly-minted German Minister of Defence Boris Pistorius witnessed unity which gave him hope about the events in Ukraine:

Mikhail Khodorkovsky and Garry Kasparov were invited along with several other guests to discuss "Russia Reimagined: Visions for a Democratic Future".

During multiple panel discussions, the Vice President of Colombia Francia Márquez and the Foreign Minister of Brazil Mauro Vieira, concurred in their condemnation of the Russian aggression, but also stated their opposition to a further militarisation of the conflict. Márquez called for a new world order, centering life and not militarisation, while Vieira stated that it is necessary to work step by step towards a negotiated settlement in the Russo-Ukrainian conflict.

At a panel on Iran and the Women, Life, Freedom protests the son of the deposed Shah, Reza Pahlavi,  was invited to share his vision for the future of Iran.  The International Business Times comments that he has no experience, and is trying to "pluck the fruits of others labor".

External links
 Munich Security Conference 2023 – official website

References

Munich
Security

Second Macron presidency
Scholz cabinet